The London Underground is a public rapid transit system in the United Kingdom that serves a large part of Greater London and adjacent parts of the home counties of Essex, Hertfordshire and Buckinghamshire. It has many closed stations, while other stations were planned but never opened for public use. Some stations were closed down because a scarcity of passengers made them uneconomic; some became redundant after lines were re-routed or replacements were built; and others are no longer served by the Underground but remain open to National Rail main line services. Many stations were planned as parts of new lines or extensions to existing ones but were later abandoned.

Some closed station buildings are still standing, converted for other uses or abandoned, while others have been demolished and their sites redeveloped. A number of stations, while still open, have closed platforms or sections, such as the Jubilee line platforms at Charing Cross. The interiors and platforms of a few closed stations are among parts of the London Underground available for filming purposes, such as those at Aldwych.

London Transport Museum runs guided tours of several disused stations including Down Street through its "Hidden London" programme. The tours look at the history of the network and feature historical details drawn from the museum's own archives and collections.

Former stations

The following stations were once served by a London Underground line or by one of the organisation's predecessor companies, but are no longer served. Many are permanently closed, but some continue to be served by National Rail main line train operators.

Unopened stations

The following stations were once planned by the London Underground or one of the early independent underground railway companies and were granted parliamentary approval. Subsequent changes of plans or shortages of funds led to these stations being cancelled before they opened, and, in most cases, before any construction work was carried out.

See also
 List of London Underground stations – includes previous names for stations
 List of closed railway stations in London
 List of closed railway stations in Britain
 List of fictional rapid transit stations
 List of London Underground-related fiction
 Ghost stations of other cities:
 Ghost stations of the Paris Métro
 Ghost stations of Berlin
 Disused Barcelona Metro stations
 List of closed New York City Subway stations

Notes and references

Notes

References

Bibliography

External links
 London's Abandoned Tube Stations
 Underground-history.co.uk
 Clive's Underground Line Guides

 
London closed
Subterranean London
Lists of railway stations in London
London transport-related lists